Amaranthus australis is also known as southern amaranth or southern water-hemp. The stems can be up to 30 cm in diameter. It is a herbaceous annual. It is found in many southern states of the United States, Mexico, the West Indies, and South America. They are frequently found in wetland areas. It is herbaceous, short lived perennial.

References

Flora of North America

australis
Flora of the Caribbean
Flora of South America
Flora of the Southeastern United States
Flora of Texas